The Sciora Dadent (or Sciora di Dentro) (3,275 m) is a mountain in the Bregaglia Range of the Alps, located south of Vicosoprano in the canton of Graubünden. It is the highest and southernmost summit of the Sciora group.

References

External links
 Sciora Dadent on Hikr
 The Sciora group on Summitpost.org

Mountains of the Alps
Alpine three-thousanders
Mountains of Graubünden
Mountains of Switzerland
Bregaglia